Yrjö Norta (originally Nyberg, 18 March 1904 – 11 November 1988) was a Finnish film director, screenwriter, editor, cinematographer and sound editor. Occasionally he used the pseudonyms Georg Nyberg and Ilmari Waltamaa. He was also the production manager and one of the founders of the film production company Fenno-Filmi.

Selected filmography as a director 

Pohjalaisia (1936)
Lapatossu (1937)
Kuin uni ja varjo (1937)
Tulitikkuja lainaamassa (1938)
Olenko minä tullut haaremiin (1938)
Yövartija vain... (1940)
Runon kuningas ja muuttolintu (1940)

References

External links

1904 births
1988 deaths
People from Turku
People from Turku and Pori Province (Grand Duchy of Finland)
Finnish film directors